Alcamarinayoc (possibly from Aymara and Quechua allqamari mountain caracara) or Colque Cruz (possibly from Aymara and Quechua qullqi money, silver, Spanish cruz cross) is a  mountain in the Vilcanota mountain range in the Andes of Peru. It is situated in the Cusco Region, Quispicanchi Province,  Ocongate District. Alcamarinayoc lies northwest of the peak of Chumpe, north of Quevesere and northeast of Ichhu Ananta.

First Ascent
Colque Cruz was first climbed by Craig Merrihue, William Hooker, Steven Jervis, Earle Whipple (USA) 14 August 1957.

Elevation
Other data from available digital elevation models: SRTM yields 6069 metres, ASTER 6050 metres and TanDEM-X 6111 metres. The height of the nearest key col is 4792 meters, leading to a topographic prominence of 1310 meters. Colque Cruz is considered a Mountain Subrange according to the Dominance System and its dominance is 21.47%. Its parent peak is Callangate and the Topographic isolation is 7.9 kilometers.

References

Mountains of Peru
Mountains of Cusco Region
Glaciers of Peru
Six-thousanders of the Andes